The women's 3000 meter at the 2018 KNSB Dutch Single Distance Championships took place in Heerenveen at the Thialf ice skating rink on Friday 27 October 2017. Although this tournament was held in 2017, it was part of the 2017–2018 speed skating season.

There were 20 participants.

Title holder was Ireen Wüst.

Overview

Result

Draw

Source:

References

Single Distance Championships
2018 Single Distance
World